Mitsuhiro Ohira (born 1934) is a Japanese wrestler. He competed in the men's freestyle light heavyweight at the 1956 Summer Olympics.

References

1934 births
Living people
Japanese male sport wrestlers
Olympic wrestlers of Japan
Wrestlers at the 1956 Summer Olympics
Place of birth missing (living people)
Asian Games medalists in wrestling
Wrestlers at the 1958 Asian Games
Medalists at the 1958 Asian Games
Asian Games bronze medalists for Japan
20th-century Japanese people
21st-century Japanese people